Simian Squared Ltd, or Simian Squared (sometimes referred to as Simian 2) is a British video game developer based in London, England. The company was founded by brothers Robert Cummings and Giuseppe Landolina in 2011.

Current work
They most recently developed a video game called "The Other Brothers". The game gained a noteworthy following early on, the company posted footage of an early alpha build in July 2012 which gained 20,000 views within the first 24 hours on YouTube. The Other Brothers was released on 3 April 2013 and went on to be featured by Apple in multiple regions. The game broke into the top twenty iPhone apps overall in the United Kingdom with a position of #20. Its peak chart position was #16 in the Games category of the store and it charted similarly in the United States, peaking at #21 in the overall iPad apps chart.

The Other Brothers was made using the company's proprietary engine, Simian Tech. It is a collection of technologies built upon the Unity 3D engine. They designed (amongst other technologies) a 'virtual Mode 7 chip' especially for the title.

Past work
In December 2011, Simian Squared released Physynth, a virtual musical instrument for the Apple iPad. The app was well received with largely positive reviews and endorsements from musicians including multi-platinum artist Jordan Rudess of Dream Theater.

Titles

References

External links
 Simian Squared's official website
 The Other Brothers game website
 Physynth website

Video game development companies
Video game companies of the United Kingdom
Software companies based in London
Companies established in 2011